Pulicherla may refer to:
Pulicherla mandal, Chittoor district, Andhra Pradesh, India
Pulicherla, Nalgonda district, Telangana, India